University of New York Tirana (UNYT) is the first private university in Albania founded in 2002. UNYT offers English language teaching including three cycles of studies. Many of UNYT alumni are currently employed by major companies in Albania and abroad, while others are pursuing post-graduate studies at top western universities.

Overview
UNYT is the only institution in Albania which has a collaboration with State University of New York and Empire State College by offering dual degree for Bachelor programs.

University of New York Tirana has a collaboration with University of Greenwich, UK, for the masters program, MSc in Computer Science.

Since 2018, UNYT is under the ownership of the Turkish Maarif Foundation, one of the largest educational organizations in the world with 427 educational institutions in 67 countries. Since December 2020, University of New York Tirana has been awarded 6 - years Institutional Accreditation which is the maximum evaluation in HEI in Albania. UNYT is accredited in all study programs.

University of New York Tirana has the following faculties:

 Faculty of Law and Social Science.
 Faculty of Economics and Business.
 Faculty of Engineering and Architecture
 European and Balkan Research Institute

Bachelor programs

Master programs

Doctoral programs 

The motto of University of New York Tirana (UNYT) is “Educating Tomorrow’s Leaders”. UNYT offers to the students, the opportunity to obtain a university degree at Bachelor, Master and PhD level in a variety of academic disciplines and professional specializations, which will provide them the knowledge, skills and confidence necessary to succeed in a diverse and international work environment, to prepare them for life as contributing citizens of the global community.

University of New York Tirana is dedicated to the spirit of learning, personal growth, and the development of a community in which active participation and freedom of expression are encouraged and supported.

 Committed to the intellectual, creative, and personal development of its students, UNYT believes that the outcomes of student learning should include:
 Excellent command of effective oral and written communication skills in English;
 Development of analytical and critical thinking skills;
 Understanding of research methods, including the ability to locate, evaluate and integrate information and data;
 Solid knowledge of different cultures and societies;
 Sensitivity to social issues, cultural and ethnic diversity;
 Understanding of international issues and a global perspective of important issues and events;
 Development of healthy interpersonal and social relationships.
 Understanding of the uses and limitations of modern technology;
 Awareness of professional opportunities and understanding of professional ethics and responsibility.
 Strengthening of the values of integrity, objectivity, and human understanding;
 Production of evidence-based research for policy making consideration.

See also
List of universities in Albania
List of colleges and universities
List of colleges and universities by country

References

External links
The University of New York Tirana
The State University of New York
Empire State College

Tirana
Universities in Albania
Educational institutions established in 2002
Universities and colleges in Tirana
2002 establishments in Albania